John Bartlett McDonald (March 6, 1908 – October 25, 1989) was an American football, basketball, and baseball coach and college athletic administrator.  Has the first head coach of Hofstra University's football and basketball teams. He compiled a 21–17–1 overall record as the football coach. MacDonald was an alumnus of New York University, class of 1933. He died in Venice, Florida in 1989. He was 81.

Head coaching record

Football

References

1908 births
1989 deaths
Basketball coaches from Vermont
Hofstra Pride athletic directors
Hofstra Pride baseball coaches
Hofstra Pride football coaches
Hofstra Pride men's basketball coaches
NYU Violets baseball players
NYU Violets football players
People from Norwich, Vermont